Sar Hadd (also Romanized as Sar Ḩadd and Sarḩad; also known as Sarḩad-e Bālā) is a village in Alqurat Rural District, in the Central District of Birjand County, South Khorasan Province, Iran. At the 2006 census, its population was 173, in 47 families.

References 

Populated places in Birjand County